The women's light heavyweight (65 kg/143 lbs) Low-Kick category at the W.A.K.O. World Championships 2007 in Belgrade was the third heaviest of the female Low-Kick tournaments, involving just six fighters - all based in Europe.  Each of the matches was three rounds of two minutes each and were fought under Low-Kick rules.    

As there were too few fighters for an eight-woman tournament, two of the competitors were given a bye through to the semi finals.  Kamila Balanda from Poland defeated Mimma Mandolini from Italy in the final by split decision to win the gold medal.  Defeated semi finalists Vera Avdeeva from Russia and Ina Ozerava from Belarus both won bronze medals.

Results

Key

See also
List of WAKO Amateur World Championships
List of WAKO Amateur European Championships
List of female kickboxers

References

External links
 WAKO World Association of Kickboxing Organizations Official Site

Kickboxing events at the WAKO World Championships 2007 Belgrade
2007 in kickboxing
Kickboxing in Serbia